Leucopogon allittii is a species of flowering plant in the family Ericaceae and is endemic to the south-west of Western Australia.

It was first formally described in 1864 by Ferdinand von Mueller in Fragmenta Phytographiae Australiae from specimens collected near the Murchison River by Augustus Oldfield. The specific epithet (allittii) honours William Allitt, who worked at the botanic gardens at Portland.

Leucopogon allittii occurs in the Avon Wheatbelt, Geraldton Sandplains, Jarrah Forest and Swan Coastal Plain bioregions of south-western Western Australia and is listed as "Priority Three" meaning that it is poorly known and known from only a few locations but is not under imminent threat.

References 

acicularis
Ericales of Australia
Flora of Western Australia
Plants described in 1868
Taxa named by George Bentham